Elfreda Higgins (born c. 1946) is an American politician who served as a member of the Garden City Council and Idaho House of Representatives from the 16B district. During her tenure in the House, Higgins served as assistant minority leader.

Education
Higgins earned her bachelor's degree in business management from the University of Phoenix.

Elections

Idaho House of Representatives

2010 
Higgins was unopposed in the Democratic primary. Higgins defeated Republican nominee Lee-Mark Ruff with 56.6% of the vote in the general election.

2008 
When 16B Democratic Representative Les Bock left the seat open in his successful bid for the district's open senate seat left vacant by retiring Democratic Senator David Langhorst,
Higgins was unopposed in the Democratic primary. Higgins defeated Republican nominee Elizabeth Allan Hodge with 55% of the vote in the general election.

Garden City Council 
Higgins was elected to the Garden City Council in 2013 and served till 2020. She previously served on that body from 2006 to 2011.

References

External links
Elfreda Higgins at the Idaho Legislature
 

1940s births
Living people
Democratic Party members of the Idaho House of Representatives
People from Ada County, Idaho
University of Phoenix alumni
Women state legislators in Idaho
Idaho city council members
Women city councillors in Idaho
21st-century American women